Chief John Smith (likely born between 1822 and 1826, though allegedly as early as 1780; died February 6, 1922) was an Ojibwe (Chippewa) Indian who lived in the area of Cass Lake, Minnesota. In 1920, two years before his death, he appeared as the main feature in a motion picture exhibition that toured the US, featuring aged Native Americans.

Biography

Chief John Smith lived his entire life in the Cass Lake area of Minnesota, and was reputed to have been 137 years old when he died of pneumonia. He was known as "The Old Indian" to the local white people. He had eight wives and no children, except for an adopted son, named Tom Smith.

Local photographers, notably including C.N. Christensen of Cass Lake, used him as a model for numerous stylized images of Ojibwe life, which were widely distributed as cabinet photos and postcards. Smith would carry cartes de visite of himself, selling them to visitors. He was known to travel for free on the trains running through the Reservation, selling his photo to passengers, and becoming something of an attraction or celebrity.

Smith converted to Catholicism in about 1914, and is buried in the Catholic section of Pine Grove Cemetery in Cass Lake.

The exact age of John Smith at the time of his death has been a subject of controversy. Federal Commissioner of Indian Enrollment Ransom J. Powell argued that "it was disease and not age that made him look the way he did" and remarked that according to records he was 88 years old. Paul Buffalo, who had met Smith when a small boy, said he had repeatedly heard the old man state that he was "seven or eight", "eight or nine" and "ten years old" when the "stars fell" in the Leonid meteor shower of November 13, 1833. Local historian Carl Zapffe writes: 
"Birthdates of Indians of the 19th Century had generally been determined by the Government in relation to the awe-inspiring shower of meteorites that burned through the American skies just before dawn on 13 November 1833, scaring the daylights out of civilized and uncivilized peoples alike. Obviously it was the end of the world. . . .". 
This estimate tied to the Leonids implies the oldest possible age of John Smith at just under 100 years at the time of his death.

Notes

References

Further reading

External links
John Smith photographs at the Minnesota Historical Society

1820s births
1922 deaths
American people with disabilities
American blind people
Burials in Minnesota
Converts to Roman Catholicism
Deaths from pneumonia in the United States
Longevity myths
Ojibwe people
People from Cass Lake, Minnesota
Year of birth uncertain
20th-century hoaxes